Maistro (formerly Blur Group) is a UK-based company which provides an online platform for organisations to buy and manage services within tail spend.

Services 
Maistro is a UK-based technology company that provides a hybrid of platform and procurement category expertise to enable organisations to purchase and manage services within the area of tail spend (small value purchases outside of contracts).

The company has a database of over 35,000 suppliers made up of providers from the UK/Europe, AsiaPac and North America. As part of using the platform customers benefit from access to the pool of suppliers, with Maistro vetting suppliers at various levels depending on the customers preferences.

The Maistro e-procurement platform uses a mix of AI and automation to enable anyone from an organisation to buy services quickly; from scoping, tendering and shortlisting to selecting, contracting and paying suppliers, while procurement teams benefit from ‘hands-off’ visibility and control, knowing that every purchase falls within their pre-defined standards.

History

Establishment
The company was founded as Blur Group PLC in 2007 and was based in Exeter Science Park, Exeter, in the UK. Its early service offerings included a b2b exchange, b-uncut.net, focused initially on the media and creative industries.

Under the leadership of CEO Philip Letts (formerly CEO of Beenz.com), an investment round in Q4 2011 attracted investment from Archie Norman, among others.

In 2012, the company claimed its 1,200th project, and went public on the London Stock Exchange Alternative Investment Market (AIM) in October 2012.

In 2013, Blur raised $11.5m in a secondary round of financing and opened an office in Dallas, Texas, followed by raising a further $22m in May 2014. Also in 2014, it claimed the third iteration of its platform was being adopted faster than anticipated. In 2015, it claimed it had 65,000 service providers.

Financial reporting concerns (2014-2017)
In 2014, Blur Group's stock price fell due to concerns regarding how revenue was reported. This came to light after a profit warning was released, indicating that multiple projects valued at over $100,000 were delayed until the next quarter, resulting in an 80% plunge in stock prices over previous year. Blur issued four profit warnings between January 2014 and May 2015, and had to replace three CFOs in two years.

An investigation led by the Financial Reporting Council (FRC) was initiated to determine if Blur Group was the principal or agent with regards to the outsourcing services provided. The investigation concluded in September 2015, with the FRC welcoming the actions taken by the Blur Group directors, which included making a prior year restatement to reduce reported revenues and increase loss before taxes, as well as clarify the organisation's revenue recognition accounting policy.

Further financial reporting problems led to the company's shares being suspended in June 2017, and reports that Blur could go into administration.

2017 leadership changes
In July 2017, the company replaced its entire board.

CEO Philip Letts left the company on 1 August 2017 (having presided over a share price plunge from a 2014 high of 665p to 3p), Laurence Cook, appointed as chief commercial officer in November 2016, became Blur Group CEO, and new chairman David Rowe slashed costs and raised £1.5 million to try to steady the company.  The company moved its UK office to Pynes Hill in Exeter in late 2017.

Name change, delisting
In January 2018, Blur Group PLC changed its name to Maistro PLC.

In March 2019, the company moved its offices back to Exeter Science Park.

On 28 June 2019, at the request of the company, Maistro PLC Ordinary Shares were cancelled from trading on AIM and the company became a private limited company, Maistro UK Ltd.

2020-present
In October 2020, CEO Laurence Cook stepped down and strategic development director Phillip Shuldham-Legh was appointed Maistro CEO. 

Former England captain and Rugby World Cup winner, Lawrence Dallaglio was company sales director until November 2022.

In November 2020, the company announced it had achieved ISO27001 accreditation.

References

External links
 Maistro Services

British brands
Companies listed on the Alternative Investment Market
Technology companies established in 2005
Technology companies of the United Kingdom